Julij Betetto (August 27, 1885 – January 14, 1963 in Ljubljana) was a Slovenian bass singer and composer. He was the first dean of the Ljubljana Academy of Music. Since 1980, the Slovene Music Artists Association has awarded the Betetto Award annually for best original music achievements; the last Betetto Award was given in 2012.

References

External links

1885 births
1963 deaths
Musicians from Ljubljana
Slovenian composers
Male composers
20th-century Slovenian male singers
Prešeren Award laureates
Academic staff of the University of Ljubljana
Slovenian male musicians